Press support is a government subsidy available for newspapers in some countries. The support can either be direct, in terms of money to the newspaper, or indirect, such as lowered or eliminated sales tax. The justification for press support is typically to maintain some level of diversity in the media market.

Press support by country

Norway 
Press support is a Norwegian state subsidy available for newspapers. The subsidy is twofold; the first part is a direct subsidy of the second- largest, by circulation, newspapers in each city. The other subsidy is that newspaper are subject to no sales tax (as are books).

Direct support
The direct subsidy is managed by the Norwegian Media Authority, and was NOK 303 million in 2006, paid to 138 newspapers. It was introduced in 1965, because of the fear of a massive newspaper death like Sweden and Denmark had seen, mainly the second largest newspapers in each city. Also, at the time, most newspapers were not political neutral, with many papers being controlled by either conservative forces, the labour movement or political parties. Support is given to all newspapers that are do not have the largest circulation in the city of publishing. There are limitations on the newspapers who can receive support, including that the support will cease if they pay a dividend to their owners. Other support is given to media research, follow-up studies, sami newspapers, immigrant publications and distribution support for Finnmark.

The press support has been partially successful, with a number of second-largest newspapers surviving, like Bergensavisen (Bergen), Rogalands Avis (Stavanger) and Dagsavisen (Oslo). Other secondary newspapers have been closed, like Trondheims-Pressen. The largest receivers are often national newspapers, targeting special (often political) sectors, like Klassekampen (Socialist), Nationen (Agrarian) and Vårt Land (Christian). Most of the large, business and tabloid newspapers, like Dagbladet or Dagens Næringsliv, do not receive support, since they pay dividend to their owners.

Indirect support
By far the greatest level of support to newspapers arises out of their exemption from sales tax and exceeds NOK 1 billion. This exemption was instituted to foster a variety of perspectives from newspapers; to stimulate public debate and consciousness, democracy, freedom of speech and to enable the media to act as society's watch-dog.

Sweden

References

External links

Mass media industry
Economics of the arts and literature
Mass media regulation
Mass media in Norway